Hydroxyestrone diacetate (brand names Colpoginon, Colpormon, Hormobion, Hormocervix) (former developmental code name RD-310), or 16α-hydroxyestrone diacetate, also known as 3,16α-dihydroxyestra-1,3,5(10)-trien-17-one 3,16α-diacetate, is a synthetic, steroidal estrogen which has been marketed in France, Spain, Brazil, and Argentina. It is a derivative of 16α-hydroxyestrone with an acetate esters attached at the C3 and C16α positions.

See also
 List of estrogens
 List of estrogen esters

References

Abandoned drugs
Acetate esters
Diols
Estranes
Estrogen esters
Ketones
Synthetic estrogens